Polkunen is a Finnish surname. Notable people with the surname include:

Mirjam Polkunen (1926–2012), Finnish writer, translator and dramatist
Sirkka Polkunen (1927–2014), Finnish cross-country skier 

Finnish-language surnames